Pennsylvania Route 481 (PA 481) is a  state highway located in Washington County, Pennsylvania.  The southern terminus is at US 40 in Centerville.  The northern terminus is at PA 88/PA 136/PA 837 in Monongahela.

Route description

PA 481 begins at an intersection with US 40 in the borough of Centerville, heading northwest on two-lane undivided Old National Pike. The route passes woods to the north and homes to the south, turning north onto Centerville Lane and passing more residences. The road makes a turn east into woods before curving north into a mix of farmland and forests with occasional homes. PA 481 continues north into West Pike Run Township and becomes Scenic Drive, continuing through more rural areas. Farther north, the route comes into Fallowfield Township and passes through Lover, heading northwest before making a turn to the northeast and interchanging with I-70. Past this interchange, the road passes through residential areas along with some fields, becoming an unnamed road. The route passes under a Wheeling and Lake Erie Railway line and passes through open agricultural areas prior to entering a mix of farmland and woodland with some homes. PA 481 turns northeast and enters Carroll Township, running through more rural areas. The road passes under the PA 43 toll freeway and heads into more forested surroundings, crossing Norfolk Southern's Ellsworth Secondary railroad line and making a turn to the east. The route turns north into residential areas before curving northeast and heading into the city of Monongahela on Park Avenue. Here, PA 481 passes more homes before passing businesses and ending at PA 88/PA 136/PA 837.

Major intersections

See also

References

External links

Pennsylvania Highways: PA 481

481
Transportation in Washington County, Pennsylvania